The Phonetic Symbol Guide is a book by Geoffrey Pullum and William Ladusaw that explains the histories and uses of the symbols of various phonetic transcription conventions. It was published in 1986, with a second edition in 1996, by the University of Chicago Press. Symbols include letters and diacritics of the International Phonetic Alphabet and Americanist phonetic notation, though not of the Uralic Phonetic Alphabet. The Guide was consulted by the International Phonetic Association when they established names and numerical codes for the International Phonetic Alphabet and was the basis for the characters of the TIPA set of phonetic fonts.

List of symbols

The symbols included in the 2nd edition of the Guide are as follows. Those not found in Unicode are marked with an asterisk.

a ȧ ä ᶏ ɐ ɑ α ɒ ɒ̇ ɒ̈ ꭤ æ æ̇ æ̈  ᴀ A 4 ꜭ *[small cap Ɐ ] Æ *[small cap  ] ʌ *[small cap Δ ] 
b ḅ ƀ b̶ b̸ ь ъ ɓ ʙ β
c ć ꞓ ȼ č ç ƈ ɕ ʗ 𝼏 C 
d đ ꟈ d̸ 𝼥 ɗ ɖ ᶑ ȸ ʣ ʤ ð δ D 
e ë ę ᶒ ə ɚ ɘ ᴇ ᴇ̈ E ɛ ɛ̇ ᶓ ʚ ɜ ɝ ɞ 
f ƒ ꜰ 
ɡ ꞡ ǥ ɠ g ɢ ʛ G ɣ γ *[palatal-hook γ] *[retroflex-hook γ] ɤ *(and its allograph )
h ḥ  ħ ɦ *[right-tail ɦ] ꜧ ɧ ɥ ʮ ʯ ʜ H 
i ï ı ɨ ɪ ɪ̈ ᵻ I ι ɿ ʅ 
j *[hook-top j] ɉ ʝ ǰ ɟ ʄ ᴊ
k ꝁ ƙ ʞ ᴋ 𝼐
l ɫ ƚ ɬ ɭ ɮ *(and its allograph ) ʟ L *[reversed ʟ] λ ƛ 
m ɱ *[h-m ligature] ɯ ɰ ᴍ M 
n ń *[left-arm n] π ƞ ñ ɲ ŋ η ɳ ɴ N 
o ȯ ö ǫ ƍ σ O ♀ ⚲ ʘ ɵ θ ø 0︀ (and its variant ∅) ɸ œ ɶ  8 
ɔ ɔ̇ ɔ̈ *[turned ꞓ] ᶗ ꭢ ω ω̇ ω̈ *[turned ω] ɷ ꭥ ꭥ̇ ꭥ̈ ꭥ̶ 
p ᵽ ƥ *[straight allograph of ƍ ] ᴘ P ρ ƿ þ
q ʠ ȹ
r ɾ ɼ ɽ ɹ ɻ ɺ ʀ R ᴙ ʁ 
s S š ʂ ʃ 𝼋 ƪ ʆ 𝼌
t ŧ 𝼪 ƫ ʈ ƭ ʇ 𝼍 ʦ ʧ
u u̇ ü ʉ *[half-barred u] ꞹ ʊ ᴜ ᴜ̇ ᵾ *[small cap ∩ ] U
v ʋ
w ◌̫ ẇ ẅ w̸ ʍ
x x̭ x̯ X χ
y ÿ ʎ ʏ
z ȥ ž ʑ ʐ ƻ ↊ ʒ ǯ ƺ ʓ ƹ ↋
ʔ ? 7 ʡ ʖ ƾ 𝼎 ʕ 9 ʢ
ǃ ǀ / ǂ ≠ ǁ ⫽ ⫻ # & *
Chao tone letters: ˩ ˨ ˧ ˦ ˥ etc.
IPA tone diacritics: ◌́ ◌̄ ◌̀ ◌̌ ◌̂ ◌᷉ etc.
◌̄ ˉ ˗ − ◌̠ ˍ + ◌̟ ◌̽ ˭
◌̪ ◌̺ ◌̻ ◌̝ ˔ ◌̞ ˕ ◌꭪ ◌꭫
ˈ ˌ ◌̩ ◌̚
↑ ↓ ↗ ↘ ˂ ˃ ◌͕ *[superscript ←]
◌̇ ꞏ . ˑ ◌̣ ◌̈ ◌̤ ꞉ ː 
ʼ ʽ ʻ , ⹁
◌̊ ◌̥ ◌̜ ˒ ◌̹
◌̃ ◌̴ ◌̰ ◌̼
◌́ ˊ ◌̀ ˋ ◌̂ ◌̭ ◌̌ ◌̬ 
◌̨ ◌̧ ◌̡ ◌˞ ◌̢ 
◌̆ ◌̑ ◌̯ ◌͡◌ ◌͜◌

Unicode support
All the symbols that are not merely allographs and that have been used by more than a single author are supported by Unicode. 

Some typewriter substitutions made by overstriking a Latin letter with a virgule require composite encoding:
, for a voiced bilabial fricative
, for a voiced dental fricative
, used for Nahua 

Similarly , an unused proposal to replace Americanist .

Several of the symbols listed above were adopted in Unicode 14 or 15 and are supported by only a few fonts (such as Gentium) as of 2022:
The Beach click letters  for the palatal clicks and curly-tail  for the nasal clicks of Khoekhoe. Used by other linguists for e.g. Sandawe. Accepted for Unicode 14 as U+1DF0B and curly-tail U+1DF0C to U+1DF0F.
t and d with a horizontal hook to the left, used alongside s, n, l, r by Daniel Jones before  were adopted by the IPA in 1923. For IPA use they were considered allographs, but had independent use in orthographies for India, and were accepted into Unicode 15 as U+1DF25 to 1DF2A. (Z with a horizontal hook was not included.)
turned small capital K, suggested in the 1949 Principles of the International Phonetic Association for a generic consonant but never adopted; now  is generally used. Accepted as a symbol for a generic click consonant in Unicode 14.

Rare symbols
The following are not supported by Unicode as of version 15, though all are supported by TIPA (see there for characters that are not clear below):

Some of the symbols are idiosyncratic proposals by well-known scholars that never caught on:

(See esp. p. 51.) Prokosch describes the symbol as a "modified h, since h is the usual spelling in all Germanic languages" (p. 83), though other authors simply write these sounds .
superscript spacing diacritic , used to indicate clicks in Smalley (1963)

Several symbols are graphic variants of characters that are supported by Unicode:
Unlike , in the Smalley letter the hook connects to the dot of the jay and so is detached from the body of the letter.
p with a tail facing left ( ɋ) and reversed o with ogonek (ǫ).
triple virgule ⫻, a close-kerned /// or italicized ⦀, used in a passing mention of retroflex clicks in the Cole article "Bushman Languages" in the 1966 Encyclopædia Britannica (4: 469). The symbol was removed from later editions. This is an allograph of a triple pipe, for which Unicode recommends using character U+2980 TRIPLE VERTICAL BAR DELIMITER .

A couple symbols were mentioned in the 1949 Principles of the International Phonetic Association as recent suggestions for further improvement and were never adopted:  

turned small capital U, for a generic vowel; now  is generally used

The majority of the non-Unicode symbols were proposed by George Trager to improve the Bloch & Trager system of vowel transcription and other conventions of Americanist notation, but were never adopted:
inverted (turned) small capital ᴀ to replace ; this had been the original IPA form of the letter that is now .

small capital  ligature (looks like an  ligature) to replace 
small capital  to replace 
barred ,   (turned ) to replace 
u with a bar on the left leg, to replace 
gamma with a palatal tail turning left, approx. γ̡, to replace 
gamma with a retroflex tail turning right, approx. γ̢, to replace 

a fusion of  +  (n with the arm of ᴛ to the left, approx.  ) for the dental nasal .
a reversed small capital L,  (turned ), for a labial lateral approximant; this is not a distinctive sound and the symbol was never used.

References

1986 non-fiction books
1996 non-fiction books
Phonetics books
Phonetic transcription symbols